Strigomonas culicis is a protist and member of flagellated trypanosomatids. It is an obligate parasite in the gastrointestinal tract of mosquito, and is in turn a host to symbiotic bacteria. It maintains strict mutualistic relationship with the bacteria as a sort of cell organelle (endosymbiont) so that it cannot lead an independent life without the bacteria. This and other symbiont-harbouring trypanosomatids such as Angomonas deanei are considered as "excellent models for the study of cell evolution because the host protozoan co-evolves with an intracellular bacterium in a mutualistic relationship", and "the origin of new organelles" (i.e. symbiogenesis).

Originally described as Blastocrithidia culicis in 1961, it was renamed Strigomonas culicis in 2011 upon establishing its genetic relationship with other related protists. The obligate bacterium belongs a group of ß-proteobacterium and provides nutrients to the host, in addition to influencing some of the cellular functions.

Taxonomy 
S. culicis was originally described as Blastocrithidia culicis by F.G. Wallace and A. Johnson in 1961. It was later considered to be the same (synonym) as Trypanosoma (Herpetomonas) culicis, a species described by Frederick G. Novy,  Ward J. MacNeal, and Harry N. Torreyin 1907. The species name refers to the mosquito Culex in which it was found. But it is also present in other mosquitos such as Aedes. When Marta M.G. Teixeira and co-workers analysed the species in 2011 along with related protists such as Angomonas deanei using molecular techniques, it was resolved that it belonged to an already existing genus Strigomonas.

Biology 

S. culicis spends its life cycle in mosquitos. It migrates from the mosquito midgut and enter the body cavity (haemocoel) and finally reside in the salivary glands. Unlike other trypanosomatids, S. culicis does not produce some amino acids such as methionine, histidine, and arginine; and vitamins such as thiamin, nicotinamide, and riboflavin. The bacterium provides these nutrients. In addition, it also provides enzymes required by the host for amino acid synthesis, lipid and purine/pyrimidine metabolism, urea cycle, haeme biosynthesis, protein synthesis, and protein folding. It can not reproduce on its own and relies on signals from the protist's nucleus. Isolated bacteria cannot survive on their own. When the bacteria are removed by antibiotic treatment, the protist survives but can not infect mosquitos.

S. culicis has about 12,162 open reading frames (ORFs).

Symbioant 
The bacterium Ca. Kinetoplastibacterium blastocrithidii is a ß-proteobacterium of the family Alcaligenaceae. It is enclosed in two layers of cell membranes, and unlike typical bacterial membrane, peptidoglycan is greatly reduced. It acts as a cell organelle not only by supplying essential enzymes, but also by replacing paraflagellar rod associated to the axoneme, thus, intimately associated with the kinetoplast. In addition, it provides surplus supply of ATP molecules for increased metabolic activities. During cell division, as the kinetoplast of the host divides so do the bacterium. The host cell controls the number of bacterial division. This coordinated mitosis results in even distribution of one bacterium in each daughter cell.

References

Protists described in 1961
Protists described in 2011
Kinetoplastids
Endosymbiotic events